The Miller Homestead is a historic house on Benton County Route 64 (Lee Town Road) in Pea Ridge, Arkansas.  It is a -story wood-frame structure, with the asymmetrical massing and wraparound porch characteristic of Late Victorian houses. It was built c. 1907, and is a relatively sophisticated architectural expression for its rural setting.  The property also includes a c. 1890 stone smokehouse.

The property was listed on the National Register of Historic Places in 1988.

See also
National Register of Historic Places listings in Benton County, Arkansas

References

Houses on the National Register of Historic Places in Arkansas
Houses completed in 1907
Houses in Benton County, Arkansas
Pea Ridge, Arkansas
National Register of Historic Places in Benton County, Arkansas